Clerodendrum splendens, the glory tree or flaming glorybower, is a species of flowering plant in the genus Clerodendrum of the family Lamiaceae, native to tropical Western Africa.

In cultivation this plant has gained the Royal Horticultural Society's Award of Garden Merit (confirmed 2017).

References

splendens
Plants described in 1824
Flora of Africa
Garden plants